Vadgaon Sheri is a neighbourhood of Pune, India. It is located off the Nagar Road. Vadgaon Sheri is mostly a residential and commercial hub of Pune. Earlier a village outside the city, It is now one of the upmarket areas of Pune, with real estate prices being quite high. It is an upmarket residential location due to easy accessibility to work and leisure as well as good educational institutions, making it a coveted and highly sought after residential destination. It is strategically located adjacent to the posh areas of Kalyani Nagar in its west and Viman Nagar in its north. The entire locality is bounded by Nagar Road towards north and Mula Mutha River towards south. Also, the upscale area of Koregaon Park and IT hub of Kharadi are easily accessible, nearly 5 km, from Wadgaon Sheri. Several apartment complexes, completed as well as developing, are spread across the locality

Location
Vadgaon Sheri is located at and shares borders with
 Kalyani Nagar
 Mula-Mutha River
 Viman nagar
 Chandan nagar
 Kharadi

The entire neighbourhood of Vadgaon Sheri lies along the Nagar Road. Other major roads in this locality are the Somnath Nagar Road, Anand Park Road, Vadgaon Sheri Main Road and Kalyani Nagar Road. The Pune Junction is about 6.5 kilometers from Vadgaon Sheri while the Pune International Airport at Lohgaon is just about 5 kilometers away. City centers like Shivajinagar, Deccan Gymkhana, Mahatma Gandhi Road, Camp, Hadapsar are all within a radius of nine to ten kilometers. The Yerwada Central Jail and the Pune Mental Hospital too are situated five kilometers.

Transport
Vadgaon Sheri is serviced by the PMPML. Buses connect it to other parts of Pune like Manpa (Bus no.165) and Kumbre Park.
Anand Park Being connected to Manpa by bus no. 133; Sainathnagar to Manpa by bus no. 133 and to Kumbre Park; Shubham Society connected to Manpa by bus no. 132. New Bus service include Vadgaon Sheri via Anand Park to Manpa (bus no. 133A) and Vadgaon Sheri via Shubham Society to Manpa (bus no. 132A).

More recently Pune Metro Rail line has been planned to pass through Vadgaon Sheri - Ramwadi area.

Other modes
Other modes of transport are auto rickshaw, six-seaters, private buses and vehicles.

Population

The total population is estimated to be around 3.9 lakhs.

Economy
Vadgaon Sheri is home to many information technology companies like Barclays, Amazon, FiServ, Mindcrest India Private Limited, Mlogica Computech India Private Limited, E Space IT Park, Azhar Pathan IT Agency.

Nearby Landmarks 

 Aga Khan Palace
 Phoenix Market City Mall
 Mariplex Mall
 Pune Airport

Education
Schools and colleges include:
St. Arnold's Central School
Bishop's Co-Ed School
Acharya Anand Rushiji Maharaj Primary School
Lonkar Madhyamik Vidyalay & College
Stella Maris English School
Fr. Agnel's Vidyankur School
Christ College
Shivraj Vidya Mandir
Mother Teresa School & Junior College
L.T. Inamdar Marathi School
L.T. Inamdar Urdu School
L.T. Inamdar English School
Anjali English School
Indian Education Soc. School
St. Francis de Sales High School
Sundarbai Marathe Vidyalaya
 EUROKIDS International Preschool

Health
Some of the hospitals include:
Kurkute Hospital
Sahyadri Hospital, Shastri Nagar
Niramay Hospital
Anup Hospital
Damodar Ravji Galande Clinic Shastri Nagar (Run by the PMC)
Kilbil Hospital
Chintamani Hospital
Vinayak Hospital
Columbia Asia Hospital (Kharadi Mundhawa road)
Family Care Clinic, Somnathnagar
Maa Saheb Thackrey Clinic (Run by PMC)

See also
 Pune
 Bhooj Adda

References

Geography of Pune